Bertie Lorraine (4 January 1913 – 19 March 1982) was a Scotland international rugby union player. He played as a Centre.

Rugby Union career

Amateur career

Lorraine played rugby for Glenalmond College.

As a university student he moved to Christ Church, Oxford studying medicine and played for Oxford University.

Provincial career

He played for the Scotland Probables in the final trial match of season 1932-33.

International career

Lorraine was capped by Scotland 3 times, and captained the side.

Army Service

Whilst at Glenalmond he joined the Officer Training Corps (OTC) and was promoted to Company Quartermaster Sergeant (CQMS). He Joined the Supplementary Reserve of Officers with the Royal Army Service Corps (RASC) and Commissioned 2nd Lieutenant on 31st December 1938. Service number 79842. In September 1939 he was mobilised and in 1940 deployed with the British Expeditionary Force (BEF) to Northern France. On the 27th May he was wounded just prior to being captured by the German 6th Panzer Division at the crossroads near Le Peckel just to the north of Cassel.  
After two days without food and water, he was forced out of the ambulance at gun point, he was told to walk over to the bunker, and get the occupants, members of The Gloucestershire Regiment, commanded by 2 Lt Roy Cresswell, to surrender. The following is a description of what happened: 

At 0900 a figure hobbled into sight of the defenders and before they could fire he shouted out "A wounded British officer here!"
The figure was a Captain called Lorraine. He'd been dragged out of an ambulance shortly after being captured and ordered to convince the defenders to surrender. As he approached the bunker Lt Cresswell started to speak, to which Capt Lorraine snapped "Don't answer back!". When he was close enough Capt Lorraine stood beside the body of a German, looked down and said "There are many Germans like that round here."  He then stared at the roof.
Lt Cresswell immediately took that to mean the Germans were on the roof and waiting to ambush his men should they surrender. Capt Lorraine then returned to German lines.  (Note: The Archive written by Cresswell, attributes Lorraine to the Royal Artillery, an easy mistake in the heat of battle and recording the event a few months later as POW.)

Derrick had not even suggested that they surrender, clearly ignoring the German orders to him. He was then transported with other Prisoners Of War (POW’s) to the South of Germany to the POW camp called Offlag VII B in the town of Eichstadt (Fuchstadt), and Oflag VIIC Laufen, Bavaria, where he spent the remainder of the War. POW number 1565.

Family

He was the son of Joseph Currie Lorraine and Margaret Kennedy. His Aunt's husband was Major General Charles William Macleod RASC.

References

1913 births
1992 deaths
Scotland international rugby union players
Scotland Probables players
Scottish rugby union players
Rugby union centres
Oxford University RFC players